Yabakei Dam is a dam in the Ōita Prefecture, Japan.

Overview 
The Yabakei Dam is a 62.0 meter high gravity-type concrete dam under the direct control of the Ministry of Land, Infrastructure, Transport and Tourism managed by the Kyushu Regional Development Bureau of the Ministry of Land, Infrastructure, Transport and Tourism. It is the main dam in the Yamakuni River system, and is a specific multipurpose dam for the purpose of hydraulic control, water utilization and hydroelectric power generation from the Yamakuni River's tributary the Yamautsuri River. Together with the Heisei Ozeki Barrage, which is located downstream, it occupies an important position not only in Nakatsu City but also in Kitakyushu City, Fukuoka Prefecture and the Kyogetsu area.

 Flood control capacity - 11.2 million m3
 Water utilization capacity - 9.8 million m3
 Unspecified irrigation water - 5.5 million m3
 Urban water and power generation (subordinate) - 4.3 million m3

At the survey stage, it was tentatively named Kakisaka Dam, which is derived from the large character of the location's name, but before the start of construction, the name was changed to Yabakei Dam, which was named after the scenic Yabakei, which is the best tourist destination in the area.

Yabakei Lake 
The artificial lake formed by the dam is named Yabakeiko. However, although it bears the name of Yabakei, it is not designated as a Yaba-Hita Hidehikoyama National Monument. Yabakei Lake has a fountain and the scenery of the dam is beautiful, so it is known as a tourist spot in Nakatsu City. 

In 1994, Japan's first public water ski facility, Yamaki Aqua Park, opened, and in addition to water skiing, you can now enjoy wakeboarding and banana boats. It used to be closed in winter, but has been open all year since 2006

External links 

 https://www.city-nakatsu.jp/docs/2012062100015/
 http://www.qsr.mlit.go.jp/yamakuni/
 http://damnet.or.jp/cgi-bin/binranA/All.cgi?db4=2783
 http://damnet.or.jp/cgi-bin/binranB/TPage.cgi?id=164&p=3

Dams in Ōita Prefecture
Dams completed in 1984

References